The Eight Government of the Republic of Croatia was the second of two Croatian Government cabinets led by Prime Minister Ivica Račan. It was announced on 30 July 2002 and its term ended on 23 December 2003.  Račan's second cabinet was formed after Croatian Social Liberal Party (HSLS) and Istrian Democratic Assembly (IDS) had decided to leave the ruling six-party coalition. The cabinet was succeeded by Cabinet of Ivo Sanader I, following the centre-right Croatian Democratic Union's return to power in the 2003 parliamentary elections.

Parties included in the government:
Social Democratic Party of Croatia (SDP)
Croatian People's Party (HNS)
Croatian Peasant Party (HSS)
Party of Liberal Democrats (Libra)
Liberal Party (LS)

Motions of confidence

Party breakdown 
Party breakdown of cabinet ministers (23 December 2003):

Changes from Cabinet of Ivica Račan I
Following the exit of IDS (in June 2001) and HSLS (in July 2002) from the ruling coalition, the cabinet was reconstructed. IDS only had one seat in the cabinet which had already been taken over by SDP. As for seven HSLS members of government (six ministers and one deputy prime minister), they were replaced either by members of SDP or by politicians from HSLS' splinter party Libra (Party of Liberal Democrats) which was formed by former HSLS members who decided to support the government rather than follow HSLS president Dražen Budiša's decision to leave the coalition and move into opposition. A third liberal party LS (Liberalna stranka), which had been established in 1997 by Vlado Gotovac as an earlier offshoot of HSLS, also chose to support the ruling coalition and gained one seat in the cabinet.

Goran Granić (ex HSLS, now Libra) returned to the post of Deputy Prime Minister after four months (Granić was Deputy Prime Minister from January 2000 to March 2002, when he was replaced by his party leader Dražen Budiša who held the post from March to July that year).
The number of Deputy Prime Ministers was expanded from three to four, with Ante Simonić (HSS) appointed as the fourth deputy. Along with three seats HSS already had in the previous cabinet, this increased their presence to four cabinet members.
Željka Antunović (SDP) continued to serve as Deputy PM, but also took on the post of defence minister, replacing Jozo Radoš (ex HSLS). Although Radoš had also left HSLS and joined the newly formed Libra, he resigned from his post to pave the way for Antunović.
Roland Žuvanić (ex HSLS, now Libra) replaced Mario Kovač (HSLS) as Minister of Maritime Affairs, Transport and Communications.
Božo Kovačević (ex HSLS, now LS) kept his post as Minister of Environmental Protection and Physical Planning, but was replaced in July 2003 by Ivo Banac (LS).
Hrvoje Kraljević (HSLS), Minister of Science and Technology, was replaced by Gvozden Flego (SDP).
Hrvoje Vojković (HSLS), Minister of Economy, was replaced by Ljubo Jurčić (SDP)
Gordana Sobol (SDP) was appointed Minister without portfolio

List of ministers and portfolios
Some periods in the table start before the cabinet's inauguration, when the minister listed was appointed to the post in the preceding Cabinet of Ivica Račan I (27 January 2000 – 30 July 2002).

References

External links
Official website of the Croatian Government
Chronology of Croatian cabinets at Hidra.hr 

Racan, 2
2002 establishments in Croatia
2003 disestablishments in Croatia
Cabinets established in 2002
Cabinets disestablished in 2003